Beach volleyball was contested at the 2013 Summer Universiade from July 8 to 13 at the Kazanka Beach Volleyball Centre in Kazan, Russia.

Medal summary

Medal table

Medal events

References

External links
2013 Summer Universiade – Beach volleyball
Results book

2013 in beach volleyball
2013 Summer Universiade events
Beach volleyball at the Summer Universiade